Cecryphalus is a genus of moths in the family Cossidae.

Species
 Cecryphalus helenae (Le Cerf, 1924)
 Cecryphalus nubila (Staudinger, 1895)

References

Natural History Museum Lepidoptera generic names catalog

Zeuzerinae
Cossidae genera